Mill Green Museum is a working watermill in Hatfield, Hertfordshire, England.
The building is listed grade II* ("The Old Mill House Museum and Mill Green Mill") and dates from the 17th century. 
The local museum is in the old miller's house.  Three galleries show changing displays of art and local history.

History
The mill uses the power of the River Lea. The Domesday Book records several mills at Hatfield, and they are assumed to have included one at this site and another upstream at Lemsford. 

In 1911 the last miller to mill commercially, Mr Lawrence, emigrated to Australia. However, the mill has been restored to full working order with 18th and 19th century wooden machinery. It is in regular use to grind organic wheat for a local bakery and for retail sale on the premises.

Access
The mill is managed by Welwyn Hatfield Borough Council. Visitors can explore the mill, see it working and chat to the miller on duty. Mill Green runs craft and baking workshops, children's activities and a school visit service.

See also

 Grade II* listed buildings in Welwyn Hatfield
 List of museums in Hertfordshire

References

External links
Mill Green Museum website
 https://www.welhat.gov.uk/mill-green
Mill Green official facebook page

Grade II* listed watermills
Grade II* listed buildings in Hertfordshire
Watermills in Hertfordshire
Watermills mentioned in the Domesday Book
Museums in Hertfordshire
Mill museums in England
Local museums in Hertfordshire